The Union Bank of Israel, Ltd.), more widely known by its Hebrew name, Bank Igud, is the sixth largest Israeli bank, with thirty branches spread around the country.

References

External links
 Official website 
 Official website 

Banks of Israel
Companies listed on the Tel Aviv Stock Exchange
1951 establishments in Israel